Rise of Nations is a real-time strategy video game developed by Big Huge Games and published by Microsoft Game Studios in May 2003. The development was led by veteran game designer Brian Reynolds, of Civilization II and Sid Meier's Alpha Centauri. The game has taken several concepts from turn-based strategy games such as territories and attrition warfare. Rise of Nations features 18 civilizations, playable through eight ages of world history.

Rise of Nations: Extended Edition is a re-release of the main game and its expansion. It released for Steam on June 12, 2014, and for the Windows 10 Store on September 14, 2017, with Xbox Live achievements and cross-play with the Steam version. Graphical changes to the game include updated textures, lighting and water. Other changes to the game include Steamworks integration which adds cloud saves, Steam Trading Cards, achievements, Twitch integration and multiplayer with Elo ranked matches to the game. Extended Edition is developed by SkyBox Labs.

Gameplay 

The core of Rise of Nations'''s gameplay centers around the concept of "territory". The area near the player's settlements is considered their territory, and players may only construct buildings within their territory or that of an ally (with the exception of the Lakota). A nation's borders can be expanded by the creation and expansion of cities  and forts, a technology tree, and obtaining access to certain rare resources. Other technologies and resources cause enemy units within a nation's borders to suffer attrition over time, which can eventually destroy an unsupplied invasion force.

People in Rise of Nations gather resources, or build or repair damaged buildings. All of the six resource types in Rise of Nations are infinite in supply.

Any of the game's nations can be played during any age, regardless of that nation's fate throughout actual history. Each of the 18 civilizations in Rise of Nations has 4 to 8 unique units. Some unique units are based on units that those nations would have, if they were not destroyed in real-life. For example, the Native American nations (the Aztecs, Maya, and Inca) have unique units in the Modern and Information ages which resemble real-world Iberian-South American guerrillas. There are 4 end conditions: capture, territorial superiority, wonder victory, or score victory.

Gameplay focuses heavily on creating a balance between offense, defense, and economy.  Generalship is also needed in this game like most RTS games; this includes a knowledge of the troops and what they are good at fighting. For example, pikemen are better than cannon at killing cavalry. Terrain plays a major part in this game and knowing the terrain is an important asset in battle. Generals can also be created from a fort to aid an army.

Five tactical formations are also available, including the ability to compress or expand the line of battle. When a formation is chosen, the selected units automatically reposition themselves accordingly, typically with faster moving units in the front and slower moving, vulnerable units in the rear.

In a manner similar to chess, slight strategic mistakes early in the game can turn into major tactical problems later on. For example, if a player starts with the nomad setting where no city is built at the start, it is wise to scout for an area that has resources before building a city, for without resources there is no army and the player will lose.

A single-player campaign, Conquer the World, is included in the game. It is comparable to the board game Risk, except that attacks are resolved with a real-time battle, which can last as long as 90 minutes depending upon the scenario. The player can also purchase reinforcements or bonus cards and engage in diplomacy with other nations. Bonus cards and reinforcement cards must be deployed from the Map screen. If the Player attacks a Nation's capital from the Map screen and wins, all of the territory belonging to that Nation come under the control of the Player and that Nation is eliminated. The campaign starts at the Ancient Age and progresses slowly over the course over the campaign to end at the Information Age (present day). During a battle it may be possible to advance to the next available age and upgrade units for the battle.Rise of Nations uses an Elo rating system to rank players.

 Units 
There are more than 100 different units in Rise of Nations, ranging from the Ancient Age Hoplite to the Information Age Stealth Bomber. Military units are created at certain structures: the Barracks, Stable/Auto Plant, Siege Factory/Factory, Dock/Shipyard/Anchorage, Airbase, Missile silo, and Fort/Castle/Fortress/Redoubt.

Most Infantry units operate in squads of three, and when a player builds an infantry unit, three soldiers are produced, rather than just one soldier. Exceptions to this rule are: Scout and Special Forces units, armed civilians, flamethrowers, and machine gunners.

Unit types, such as Light Infantry, Heavy Infantry, and Ranged Cavalry, can be upgraded as the player advances through the ages. These upgrades usually represent revolutionary changes in their particular field. For example, the Arquebusier of the Gunpowder Age becomes the Musketeer of the Enlightenment Age, representing the great advantage of flintlock muskets over the earlier matchlock muskets and showing increased attack power and reload speed. Also, each nation gets its own set of unique units. For example, the Greeks can build Companion cavalry; the Russians can build Red Guards infantry and T-80 tanks; the British can build Longbowmen, Highlanders, and Avro Lancaster Bombers; and the Germans get the Tiger and Leopard tanks. In the Thrones and Patriots expansion pack, the Americans can build various Marine units.

Because of the wide variety of units in the game, players have the opportunity to create an army customized to their tastes. Most units have a cost that is roughly equal to that of their peers. Additionally, most units use only two resource types, making the creation of diverse armies easier and almost required. Terraced costs further contribute to the incentive for a diverse army, as each additional unit a player creates of a single type will cost slightly more than the last.

 Wonders 
Wonders are important buildings in the game. They are real-life structures ranging from the Colossus and the Pyramids to the Supercollider and Space Program. They provide various benefits such as improving resource gathering or making units cheaper. Building wonders can also allow a player to win the game if 'wonder victory' is chosen as a custom setting of the game, as each wonder is worth a preset number of "Wonder Points". Wonders can be built starting in the Classical Age. The only exception is the Egyptians, who can make wonders an age earlier. As you progress in the game the wonders become more expensive, but generate more points. For example, the Supercollider is worth eight times as much as the Pyramids in terms of Wonder Points.

 Multiplayer 
GameSpy originally used to host the game but currently does not host the game on their servers. The LAN networking, implemented on both platforms, provides a system for people on the same network to play together. There is also a Direct-IP option, allowing non-networked players to connect without the use of GameSpy. Cross-platform play is not supported between Windows and Mac users.

The game is currently available on Steam which makes multiplayer games simple to create.

 Development 

38 Studios acquired the rights to Rise of Nations and Rise of Legends, when it acquired Big Huge Games in 2009. After 38 Studios filed for bankruptcy in 2012 its rights to Rise of Nations were sold at an auction to Microsoft.

 Related games 

 Thrones and Patriots 

On April 28, 2004, Big Huge Games released Rise of Nations: Thrones and Patriots, an expansion pack. Later that year, a Gold edition of Rise of Nations was released, which included both the original and the expansion.

 Rise of Legends 

In May 2006, Big Huge Games released Rise of Nations: Rise of Legends, a fantasy-themed spin-off with similar gameplay.

 Tactics Rise of Nations: Tactics, a game for iOS, was in development at Big Huge Games but was cancelled.

 Extended Edition 
38 Studios bought Big Huge Games at the time it acquired Rise of Nations IP. When 38 Studios went bankrupt, at the auction, Microsoft bought the IP back and charged SkyBox Labs to do the extended edition. Rise of Nations and its expansion pack has been revitalized under the name Rise of Nations: Extended Edition and was released on June 12, 2014, on Steam. Extended Edition features a high definition graphics upgrade, multiplayer ranked matches, and Twitch integration. The core of the game remains untouched.

 Reception Rise of Nations received "generally favorable reviews", just one point shy of "universal acclaim", according to the review aggregation website Metacritic.

 Awards 
 GameSpy 2003 Game of the Year - PC RTS
 GameSpy Top 10 RTS Games
 Best Strategy Game of 2003 by GameSpot
 Best PC Game of 2003 by GameSpotGameSpot named Rise of Nations the best computer game of May 2003.Rise of Nations won PC Gamer USs 2003 "Best Real-Time Strategy Game" award, and was a runner-up in the magazine's "Best Game of 2003" category, which went to Knights of the Old Republic. The publication's William Harms called it "a blueprint for the genre's future" and "how RTS games should be made from here on out". Computer Games Magazine named Rise of Nations the fifth-best computer game of 2003, and presented it with an award for "Best Interface". The editors wrote that the game "succeeds in a big way, and is about as addictive as they come." The editors of Computer Gaming World nominated Rise of Nations for their 2003 "Strategy Game of the Year" award, but it lost to Age of Wonders: Shadow Magic.

 Sales Rise of Nations and its expansion pack Rise of Nations: Thrones and Patriots have received combined sales of over 1 million copies. In the United States, Rise of Nations sold 420,000 copies and earned $15.9 million by August 2006, after its release in May 2003. It was the country's 35th best-selling computer game between January 2000 and August 2006. Combined sales of all Rise of Nations-related games released between January 2000 and August 2006 had reached 700,000 units in the United States by the latter date.

 Scientific study Rise of Nations'' was shown in 2008 to improve a variety of "critical cognitive skills", most prominently working memory and task-switching ability, in older adults.

Notes

References

External links 
 Official website for Rise of Nations: Extended Edition
 Rise of Nations: Gold Edition, from MacSoft
 

 
2003 video games
Microsoft games
Microsoft franchises
MacOS games
Panhistorical video games
Real-time strategy video games
Video games developed in the United States
Video games with expansion packs
Video games with historical settings
Video games with isometric graphics
Windows games
Video games with Steam Workshop support
MacSoft games
Multiplayer and single-player video games
SkyBox Labs games
Big Huge Games games
Westlake Interactive games